Sidi Ghanem is a small town and rural commune in Rehamna Province of the Marrakesh-Safi region of Morocco. At the time of the 2014 census, the commune had a total population of 10,099 people living in 1636 households. At the time of the 2004 census, when it was part of to El Kelâat Es-Sraghna Province, the commune had a total population of 12,159 people living in 1799 households.

References

Populated places in Rehamna Province
Rural communes of Marrakesh-Safi